Kim Boo-gwan (born 3 September 1990) is a South Korean footballer who plays as winger for Busan TC in Korea National League.

Career
Kim signed with Korea National League side Gimhae FC in 2012.

He was selected by Suwon FC in 2015 K League draft.

References

External links 

1990 births
Living people
Association football midfielders
South Korean footballers
Suwon FC players
Asan Mugunghwa FC players
Busan Transportation Corporation FC players
Korea National League players
K League 2 players